The Junior Reserve Officer Training Corps (JROTC, commonly pronounced ) is a federal program sponsored by the United States Armed Forces in high schools and also in some middle schools across the United States and at US military bases across the world. The program was originally created as part of the National Defense Act of 1916 and later expanded under the 1964 ROTC Vitalization Act.

Role and purpose

According to Title 10, Section 2031 of the United States Code, the purpose of the Junior Reserve Officers' Training Corps is "to instill in students in [the United States] secondary educational institutions the values of citizenship, service to the United States, and personal responsibility and a sense of accomplishment." Additional objectives are established by the service departments of the Department of Defense. Under 542.4 of Title 32 (National Defense) of the Code of Federal Regulations, the Department of the Army has declared those objectives for each cadet to be:

Developing citizenship and patriotism
Developing self-reliance and responsiveness to all authority
Improving the ability to communicate well both orally and in writing
Developing an appreciation of the importance of physical fitness
Increasing a respect for the role of the U.S. Armed Forces in support of national objectives
Developing a knowledge of team building skills and basic military skills
Taking 1–3 years of the course grants cadets the ability to rank higher if they pursue a military career.

Section 524.5 of the CFR National Defense title states in part that JROTC should "provide meaningful leadership instruction of benefit to the student and of value to the Armed Forces. ...Students will acquire: (1) An understanding of the fundamental concept of leadership, military art and science, (2) An introduction to related professional knowledge, and (3) An appreciation of requirements for national security. The dual roles of citizen/soldier and soldier/citizen are studied. ... These programs will enable cadets to better serve their country as leaders, as citizens, and in military service should they enter it. ... The JROTC and NDCC are not, of themselves, officer-producing programs but should create favorable attitudes and impressions toward the Services and toward careers in the Armed Forces." 

The military has stated that JROTC will inform young Americans about the opportunities available in the military and "may help motivate young Americans toward military service." A 1999 Army policy memorandum stated that "While not designed to be a specific recruiting tool, there is nothing in existing law that precludes ... facilitating the recruitment of young men and women into the U.S. Army," directing instructors to "actively assist cadets who want to enlist in the military [and] emphasize service in the U.S. Army; facilitate recruiter access to cadets in JROTC program and to the entire student body ... [and] work closely with high school guidance counselors to sell the Army story."

In a February 2000 testimony before the House Armed Services Committee, the armed service chiefs of staff testified that 30%–50% of graduating JROTC cadets go on to join the military:
General James L. Jones, then Commandant of the Marine Corps, testified that the value of the Marine JROTC program "is beyond contest. Fully one-third of our young men and women who join a Junior ROTC program wind up wearing the uniform of a Marine."
General Eric K. Shinseki, then Chief of Staff of the United States Army, testified that "Our indications are about 30 percent of those youngsters—we don't recruit them, as you know. We are not permitted to do that. But by virtue of the things that they like about that experience, about 30 percent of them end up joining the Army, either enlisting or going on to ROTC and then joining the officer population."
General Michael E. Ryan, then Chief of Staff of the United States Air Force, testified that "almost 50 percent of the folks that go [...] out of the Air Force Junior ROTC go into one of the Services by enlisting or going to ROTC or going to one of the academies."
Admiral Jay L. Johnson, then Chief of Naval Operations, testified that "Even if the number is only 30 percent, that is a good number. But think about what we get out of the other 70 percent. They have exposure to us. They have exposure to the military. And the challenge of the education mandate that we all share in principals and school counselors and school districts that won't let us in, that is a powerful tool I think to educate whether or not they end up in the service. So it is a long way around saying it is well worth the investment for lots of different reasons."
General Colin Powell said in his 1995 autobiography that "the armed forces might get a youngster more inclined to enlist as a result of Junior ROTC," but added that "Inner-city kids, many from broken homes, found stability and role models in Junior ROTC." U.S. Congress found in the Recruiting, Retention, and Reservist Promotion Act of 2000 that JROTC and similar programs "provide significant benefits for the Armed Forces, including significant public relations benefits." Former United States Secretary of Defense William Cohen referred to JROTC as "one of the best recruitment programs we could have."

Organization

Six of the eight branches of the Uniformed services of the United States maintain a Junior Reserve Officers' Training Corps, organized into units. There are a total of 3,275 units:
1,600 Army AJROTC units
794 Air Force AFJROTC units
619 Navy NJROTC units
260 Marine Corps MCJROTC units
10 Space Force SFJROTC units 
2 Coast Guard CGJROTC units (2 more planned to commence in 2021)

Prior to 1967 the number of units was limited to 1,200. The cap was increased to 1,600 units in 1967 and again to 3,500 units in 1992; the statutory limitation on the number of units was struck from the law in 2001. Their goal was to reach 3,500 units by February 2011 by encouraging program expansion into educationally and economically deprived areas.

Units are set up according to the layout of their parent service, often referred to as the "Chain of Command." Army JROTC units follow a company (usually the period the class is held in), battalion (all periods), and at larger events brigade (multiple battalions) structure. Marine Corps JROTC units follow the battalion, or in cases of larger size, brigade structure. Air Force JROTC units are composed structurally based on size. Individual if one, detail if 2, element if more than 2 and no more than 8, flight if 26, squadron if more than 51, group if more than 101, and wing if more than 251 cadets. Navy JROTC typically follows the company (100-149 cadets), battalion (150-299 cadets), or regiment (300+ cadets) structure depending on the size of the unit.

JROTC funding

JROTC is partly funded by the United States Department of Defense with an allocation in the military budget of about $340 million dollars for the fiscal year 2007, of which about 68 million are personnel costs. The federal government subsidizes instructor salaries, cadet uniforms, equipment and textbooks. The instructors, usually retired military personnel, continue to receive retirement pay from the Federal government, but in addition, the schools pay the difference from what the instructors would receive if they were on active duty. The service concerned then reimburses the school for approximately one-half of the amount paid by the school to the instructor.

Note: Space Force JROTC funding is included in Air Force JROTC.

Military staff and instructors
Although active duty officers may be assigned to JROTC, this is exceedingly rare, and is primarily limited to staff at the major command or sub-command headquarters overseeing each service's respective JROTC program or regional administrators overseeing a set number of individual units. Unlike the college/university ROTC program, which is an actual military officer training and accession track, the vast majority of NJROTC instructors are retired from the sponsoring branch of the Armed Forces. In the Army JROTC program, the cadet unit at each school is directed by at least one retired commissioned officer in the grade of Captain through Colonel) or a Warrant Officer (WO1 through CW5) who is designated as the Senior Army Instructor, and who is assisted by at least one retired Non-Commissioned Officer in the grade of Staff Sergeant through Command Sergeant Major who is designated as an Army Instructor (AI). In certain situations, there may be additional instructors.

A new provision from the John Warner National Defense Authorization Act for Fiscal Year 2007 (Section 540) that was signed into law in October 2006 permits retired Reserve Component officers and noncommissioned officers to be hired as instructors.

There are no national requirements that JROTC instructors have the teaching credential required by other teachers in public high school, although there are a handful of counties that do require a teaching credential. In at least one jurisdiction (California), the government requires JROTC instructors to have at least four years of military experience and possess a high school diploma or equivalent. AJROTC instructors need to be within one year of retirement or retired from active military service for five or fewer years. MCJROTC instructors need to have graduated from high school, have at least 20 years of active military service and be physically qualified according to Marine Corps standards.

AFJROTC previously required a minimum of 20 years of active duty but has since been overridden by a provision in the John Warner National Defense Authorization Act for Fiscal Year 2007 (Section 540), signed into law in October 2006, permitting retired Reserve Component (e.g., Air Force Reserve and Air National Guard officers and noncommissioned officers to be hired as instructors. Officer instructors need to have a minimum of a bachelor's degree, while a high school diploma or equivalent is sufficient for enlisted instructors.

For AJROTC the Non-commissioned Officer has to attain an associate degree (AA), with teaching credential, in order to be assigned an AI. To be assigned as a SAI the AJROTC Instructor has to hold a BA degree, with teaching credentials.

NJROTC also required a minimum of 20 years of active duty until it was overridden by a provision in the John Warner National Defense Authorization Act for Fiscal Year 2007 (Section 540), signed into law in October 2006, permitting retired Reserve Component personnel (e.g., U.S. Navy Reserve officers, chief petty officers and petty officers) to be hired as NJROTC instructors. The minimum education requirement for an enlisted Naval Science Instructor (NSI) is a high school diploma or equivalent, with a baccalaureate degree from an accredited college or university required for a commissioned officer to serves as a Senior Naval Science Instructor (SNSI). The Navy requires that JROTC instructors be employees of the school or school district and that they are accorded the same status as other school faculty members.

National Defense Cadet Corps (NDCC) offers similar programs as JROTC. NDCC units differ from JROTC in that they receive little or no financial support from the Armed Forces; uniforms, equipment, other materials and instructor salaries must normally be furnished by the school hosting an NDCC program. Except for the funding aspects, JROTC and NDCC programs are virtually identical, although the cadet corps is not limited by the federal statute that restricts JROTC to offering courses only for students in ninth through 12th grades. Per 2005, Chicago had 26 Middle School Cadet Corps enlisting more than 850 students.

Instruction and activities

The Code of Federal Regulations states that JROTC is "designed for physically fit citizens attending participating schools." In public schools, JROTC is usually an elective course with membership limited to US citizens and legal foreign nationals, those who will graduate with their 9th-grade cohort, and have not experienced an out of school suspension during the preceding six-month period. Often, students who participate for one year receive credit in lieu of a physical education class. Students who excel in the first year of JROTC can apply for a second year. Most schools offer three to four years of JROTC training.

Boarding schools or (pre-college) military schools may offer JROTC programs, with some requiring participation as a condition for acceptance to the school. Some public military schools mandate JROTC as a class for all grade levels, and have a curriculum that includes military history, military protocol, civics, and physical fitness. Chicago has six public military academies, more than any other city and one-third of all in the country.

The JROTC program stresses military discipline, with a curriculum that emphasizes study of military science and military history. Cadets typically wear their uniforms once or twice a week, usually standing for inspection, with the exception being those cadets who attend a JROTC-based military academy. Their creed encourages conduct that brings credit to family, country, school and the corps of cadets, loyalty, citizenship and patriotism. Many cadets participate in extracurricular activities such as the following:

Drill (unarmed, armed and regulation drill)
Color Guard
PT team
Rocketry (usually available in AFJROTC)
Orienteering
Rifle or pistol marksmanship programs (offered by at least two-thirds of JROTC units) 
Academic Team
Drum corps
Marching Band (although very rare)

The most notable JROTC marching band is the Virginia 91st Air Force Junior ROTC Band of the Randolph-Macon Academy. Being a rare part of a JROTC unit, there are few in existence, with the state of Texas only boasting two units with marching bands.

There are other extracurricular activities that the JROTC's programs provide for their cadets, including trips to military installations, ROTC college programs, and other sites that give the cadets a look at the military community. During the school year, there are regional competitions between JROTC units, with testing in all areas of military, naval and aerospace science. Some units organize special visits to US military bases during school breaks. There are also many summertime "leadership academies" for cadets hosted by various military installations. These academies include the JROTC Leadership and Academic Bowl (JLAB), and JROTC Cadet Leadership Challenge (JCLC), a physical fitness competition.

Cadets may be awarded ribbons, ribbon devices, medals and aiguillettes for participation in JROTC and team activities, as well as for personal academic and athletic achievement and leadership. Awards may be presented by organizations other than the cadet's JROTC program, such as other JROTC programs, Military Officers Association of America, American Veterans, Order of the Daedalians, American Legion, and the National Rifle Association. Ribbons and medals are positioned in order of precedence, as prescribed by the Cadet Field Manual and the senior JROTC instructor.

Some units also host an annual formal military ball (mess dress) and formal dinner. Usually, awards are presented. Female cadets are generally excused from wearing the dress uniform for military ball. Sometimes units also have a separate awards ceremony, which is attended by the instructors, guests, and parents. Fraternal organizations, such as the American Legion, often give out awards for military excellence, academics, and citizenship, in addition to the standard awards given by the JROTC program. The year may be finished with a change of command ceremony, where the new unit commander, executive officer, and other unit officers are named and take command from the current officers. Mid-level officers are also named. Some units choose the next year's NCO and junior officer corps based on officer and NCO candidate schools, usually held immediately following the end of the school year.

Successful completion of a JROTC Program (1–3 years of classes) can lead to advanced rank upon enlistment in the Armed Forces. For example, upon completion of three years of Air Force JROTC, cadets may at their instructor's discretion enlist in the Air Force at the rank of Airman First Class (E-3). However, JROTC participation incurs no obligation to join the military.

A JROTC unit (through the Senior Instructor) may recommend current JROTC cadets for nomination to the Service Academy of the unit's branch. JROTC units designated as Honor Units may nominate up to three cadets to the Service Academy of any branch, in addition to the nominations to the unit's own branch academy.

Competitions

Leadership and Academic Bowl
The JROTC Leadership and Academic Bowl (JLAB) is a national academic competition which is the largest of its kind for high schools in the country. There are three levels of the competition, which units who complete levels 1 and 2 successfully attending the last level at Catholic University of America in Washington D.C. Subjects that are covered in all three levels include history, literature, current events and JROTC curriculum. Depending on the represented branch, there may be 4-8 cadets representing a school. Aside from Cadet Command, the competition is also sponsored by the College Options Foundation.

National High School Drill Team Championship
Established in 1982, the National High School Drill Team Championship is a joint-service exhibition drill competition for JROTC drill teams, held in Daytona Beach, Florida. Although it has been held since 1982, it only became an officially service-based sanctioned event when the U.S. Army Cadet Command became the sponsor in 1988.

Cadet Creeds
In every branch of the Junior Reserve Officers' Training Corps, there is a branch creed that every cadet in their designated branches must remember.

Army Junior Reserves Officers' Training Corps Cadet Creed
I am an Army Junior ROTC Cadet.

I will always conduct myself to bring credit to my family, country, school, and the Corps of Cadets. 

I am loyal and patriotic. 

I am the future of the United States of America.

I do not lie, cheat, or steal, and will always be accountable for my actions, and deeds. 

I will always practice good citizenship and patriotism.

I will work hard to improve my mind and strengthen my body.

I will seek the mantle of leadership and stand prepared to uphold the Constitution and the American way of life.

May God grant me the strength to always live by this creed!

Marine Corps Junior Reserves Officers' Training Corps Cadet Creed
I am a Marine Cadet.

I will be true to myself and to others.

I will not lie, cheat, or steal.

I will serve my school, community, and nation.

I will wear my uniform with pride.

I will do my personal best at all times.

I will honor those who have gone before me: the Few, the Proud, the Finest.

Oorah!

Navy Junior Reserves Officers' Training Corps Cadet Creed
I am a Navy Junior ROTC cadet.

I strive to promote patriotism and become an informed and responsible citizen.

I respect those in positions of authority.

I support those who have defended freedom and democracy around the world.

I proudly embrace the Navy’s core values of Honor, Courage and Commitment.

I am committed to excellence and the fair treatment of all!

Air Force Junior Reserves Officers' Training Corps Cadet Creed
I am an Air Force Junior ROTC Cadet.

I am connected and faithful to every Corps of Cadets who served their community and nation with patriotism. 

I earn respect when I uphold the Core Values of Integrity First, Service Before Self, and Excellence In All We Do. 

I will always conduct myself to bring credit to my family, school, Corps of Cadets, community, and to myself. 

My character defines me. I will not lie, cheat, or steal. I am accountable for my actions and deeds. 

I will hold others accountable for their actions as well. I will honor those I serve with, those who have gone before me, and those who will come after me. 

I am a Patriot, a Leader, and a Wingman devoted to those I follow, serve, and lead. 

I am an Air Force Junior ROTC Cadet!

Coast Guard Junior Reserves Officers' Training Corps Cadet Creed
I am proud to be a United States Coast Guard JROTC Cadet.

I revere that long line of Splendid Coasties who, by their devotion to duty and sacrifice, have made it possible for me to be associated with a service honored and respected throughout the world. 

I never, by word or deed, will bring disgrace upon the name of the U.S Coast Guard.

I will cheerfully fulfill my commitments and obligations and shall endeavor to do more, rather than less, than my share. 

I will always act with integrity and be respectful. 

I shall endeavor to be a model citizen in the community in which I live in.

I shall endeavor to be a noble work, living by the Coast Guard's core values: Honor, Respect, and Devotion to Duty!

Awards and decorations

Army Junior Reserve Officers Training Corps

Navy Junior Reserve Officers Training Corps

Air Force Junior Reserve Officers Training Corps

Career military who were members of JROTC

Many members of JROTC go on to have careers in the United States Armed Forces as they are twice as likely to enlist than other high school students. Some notable former members of JROTC include:
William J. Bordelon, Central Catholic Marianist High School 1938, staff sergeant, U.S. Marine Corps, awarded the Medal of Honor
Harry B. Harris Jr., admiral, U.S. Navy; first Asian-American to achieve the rank of admiral in the Navy; served as commander of U.S. Pacific Command
Baldomero Lopez, first lieutenant, U.S. Marine Corps, awarded the Medal of Honor
James Cartwright, general, U.S. Marine Corps, Vice Chairman of the Joint Chiefs of Staff
Shoshana Johnson, specialist, U.S. Army, first female African-American prisoner of war in the history of the United States military (medically retired)
Emily Perez, Oxon Hill High School 2001, second lieutenant, U.S. Army; first Class of 9/11 West Point graduate to die in the Iraq War
Alan G. Rogers, major, U.S. Army
Allen B. West, lieutenant colonel, U.S. Army and United States Representative from Florida, Henry Grady High School JROTC
Thomas E. White, brigadier general, U.S. Army, Secretary of the Army, 2001–2003
Charles D. "Ranger Dave" Sellers, major, U.S. Air Force & U.S. Army, Booker High School JROTC, 1986-1990

Controversy
There has been controversy about JROTC and militarism in schools. The American Friends Service Committee, the Central Committee for Conscientious Objectors (CCCO), Veterans for Peace, War Resisters League, and the Project on Youth and Nonmilitary Opportunities, actively oppose the JROTC for a number of reasons, including:
 High cost—A 1999 report by the American Friends Service Committee found that local school districts ended up paying substantially more than the cost estimate the military provided, and that a JROTC program cost more on a per-pupil basis than academic, non-military instruction.
 Lack of local control—The CCCO is concerned that the federal military dictates the JROTC curriculum and selects the instructors, resulting in local school districts losing control of curriculum and staff.
 Low-quality curriculum—The CCCO considers the JROTC textbooks to contain substandard learning material with factual distortions and outdated methods of teaching, basing their conclusions on a 1995 academic study of the Army JROTC curriculum commissioned by the American Friends Service Committee, which argues that the curriculum narrows the viewpoint of the students, encourages blind following rather than critical thinking, and indoctrinates students in militaristic authoritarian loyalty and passivity. Veterans for Peace resolved that JROTC teaching that the government gives the citizens its rights "is a complete perversion of the Constitution and the Declaration of Independence."

The Coalition For Alternatives to Militarism in Our Schools, formed by more than 50 teachers in the Los Angeles Unified School District, aims to "eliminate the Junior Reserves Officer Training Corps in our High Schools." Many cases of abuse by JROTC instructors, as well as credentialing issues, and of having students forced into JROTC due to lack of space in physical education classes have been noted in Los Angeles Public Schools. The group claims 2006 showed a reduction in JROTC enrollment in Los Angeles, with a drop of one-third or approximately 1,500 students, suggesting part of the explanation is efforts to stop the involuntary enrollment of students into JROTC. At Roosevelt High School in the Boyle Heights section of Los Angeles, a local campaign against JROTC cut the number of cadets 43 percent in four years, with a JROTC instructor reporting a 24 percent drop in enrollment from 2003–04 to 2006-07 for the rest of the Los Angeles unified School District.

In October 2005, the New York Civil Liberties Union pressured Hutchinson Central Technical High School in Buffalo, New York to release students from a mandatory JROTC program, arguing that the practice violates the State's Education Law, which provides that no child may be enrolled in JROTC without prior written parental consent.

In May 2008, the American Civil Liberties Union stated that JROTC violates the United Nations sponsored Convention on the Rights of the Child by targeting students as young as 14 for recruitment to the military. The United States has not ratified the convention, although it has ratified an optional protocol to the Convention on "the Rights of the Child on the Involvement of Children in Armed Conflict." However, recruiting is not an official goal of JROTC, as stated in United States Code pertaining to the program. Nor is it a stated goal in each of the individual service's JROTC program mission statements.

Sexual harassment and assault of JROTC cadets by instructors is reported to have occurred in the program, and some instructors have been criminally charged in relation to these crimes. Lack of oversight and the minimal training required for instructors have been cited as factors contributing to this problem.

See also
Junior Reserve Officers' Training Corps ranks
Delaware Military Academy 
Reserve Officers' Training Corps
Army Reserve Officers' Training Corps
Naval Reserve Officer Training Corps (includes Marines)
Air Force Reserve Officer Training Corps (includes Guardians)
Pershing Rifles
High school gun clubs and teams in the United States
M1903 Springfield - Used to teach weapons handling and military drill procedures to the cadets within JROTC units.
M1 Garand

Other similar U.S.-based organizations
Youth-based, non-ROTC organizations include:
United States Army Cadet Corps (formerly the American Cadet Alliance)
Civil Air Patrol
United States Naval Sea Cadet Corps
Young Marines
California Cadet Corps
Middle School Cadet Corps
Navy League Cadet Corps
Knickerbocker Greys
New York Military Academy (NYMA)

Similar organizations in other countries
 Antigua and Barbuda Cadet Corps
 Australian Air Force Cadets
 Australian Army Cadets
 Australian Navy Cadets
 Bangladesh National Cadet Corps
 Royal Belgian Sea Cadet Corps
 Bermuda Sea Cadet Corps
 Lithuanian Riflemen's Union
 National Cadet Corps (Ghana)
 National Cadet Corps (India)
 National Cadet Corps (Singapore)
 Gadna military training
 Hong Kong Adventure Corps
 Hong Kong Air Cadet Corps
 Hong Kong Army Cadets Association Limited
 Hong Kong Sea Cadet Corps
 Cadet Colleges in Pakistan
 Citizenship Advancement Training
 Royal Canadian Air Cadets
 Royal Canadian Army Cadets
 Royal Canadian Sea Cadets
 United Kingdom Air Cadets
 United Kingdom Army Cadets
 United Kingdom Sea Cadets
 United Kingdom Combined Cadet Force
 Cadet Corps of Russia
 Young Army Cadets National Movement

References

Videos
Atlanta Public Schools' JROTC Pass-in-Review
Union HS Army JROTC Unarmed Regulation at Central Regional Drill Competition 2019
North Salem HS JROTC Vanir Guard Color Guard @ The Nationals, 5 May 2017
Joint Service Academic Bowl Championship
Ozark High School JROTC Drill Team 2017
Virginia 91st Air Force JROTC Band at Fall Family Day Parade 2015
JROTC Spring Competition - Lincoln Drum Corps 2015

External links

 U.S. Air Force University JROTC
 U.S. Army JROTC
 U.S. Marine Corps JROTC
 U.S. Navy JROTC

 
1916 establishments in the United States
1916 in military history
Army cadet organisations
National Defense Act of 1916
Student organizations established in 1916